Doniella Davy, also known as Donni, is an American makeup artist and film/TV makeup department head. She is most known for her work on HBO’s epic teen drama Euphoria. In 2022 she co-founded cult beauty brand Half Magic Beauty along with A24 Films.

Early life 

Davy was born and raised in Venice, CA. With a background in photography, painting and drawing, Davy moved to Brooklyn, New York to attend Pratt Institute. She graduated with a BFA in photography in 2010.

Career 

In 2012, Davy started her makeup career by taking a crash course in special effects and beauty makeup with established film industry makeup department head, Jane Galli.

After answering numerous makeup ads on Craigslist, Davy began practicing her craft by working with film students in Los Angeles. These early days working on student films led her to eventually land her first narrative feature film job, Kicks, as the makeup department head. Davy would then work on 2017 Best Picture Academy Award-winner Moonlight, as well as Under the Silver Lake, If Beale Street Could Talk, and Euphoria.

In 2020, Davy won an Emmy for Outstanding Contemporary Makeup on Euphoria. She won her second Emmy for Outstanding Contemporary Makeup on Euphoria in 2022.

Personal life 
Davy lives in east Los Angeles with her husband. and she is a makeup artist from euphoria

References 

American make-up artists
Year of birth missing (living people)
Living people
Primetime Emmy Award winners